Alberto César Mancini (born 20 May  1969) is a former professional tennis player from Argentina. He won three top-level singles titles and four tour doubles titles. His career-high rankings were World No. 8 in singles and No. 79 in doubles (both in 1989). His career prize-money totalled $1,543,120.

Player career

Mancini turned professional in 1987. In 1988, he won his first top-level singles title at Bologna, and his first tour doubles title at St. Vincent.

Mancini won the two most significant titles of his career in 1989. In April that year he won the Monte Carlo Open, defeating Boris Becker in the final 7–5, 2–6, 7–6, 7–5. In May he won the Italian Open, beating Andre Agassi in the final 6–3, 4–6, 2–6, 7–6, 6–1, saving match point in the fourth set. Both events were part of the Grand Prix Championship Series. Mancini also reached the quarter-finals of the 1989 French Open, his career-best performance at a Grand Slam event. He defeated Simon Youl, Martín Jaite, Paul Haarhuis and Jakob Hlasek before losing to Stefan Edberg.

Mancini reached the final of the Italian Open again in 1991, but was forced to retire during the final against Emilio Sánchez with Sánchez leading 6–3, 6–1, 3–0. The last major final of Mancini's career was at the Lipton International players Championships in Florida in 1992, where he lost to Michael Chang 7–5, 7–5.

Mancini, a competitor at the 1992 Summer Olympics in Barcelona, retired from the professional tour in 1994.

Coaching career

In February 2003, Mancini became the coach of Guillermo Coria. Under Mancini's guidance, Coria won the tournaments at 2003 Hamburg, 2003 Stuttgart, 2003 Kitzbühel, 2003 Sopot and 2003 Basel, as well as reaching the final of 2003 Monte Carlo, the semi finals of the 2003 French Open, and the quarter finals of the 2003 US Open. Coria finished 2003 as world number 5. Despite these successes, Coria surprisingly decided to part ways with Mancini in February 2004, soon after an upset first round loss at the 2004 Australian Open.

Mancini went on to become captain of the Argentina Davis Cup team, and led Argentina to the Davis Cup final in both 2006 and 2008. However, Argentina lost both finals. Mancini resigned his position as captain of the team after losing in Argentina to Spain in the 2008 Davis Cup final.

In 2010 he was granted the Konex Award Merit Diploma as one of the five best coaches of the last decade in Argentina.

In November 2020, Mancini became the coach of Fabio Fognini.

Performance timeline

Singles

ATP Career Finals

Singles: 8 (3 titles, 5 runner-ups)

Doubles (4 wins, 2 losses)

ATP Challenger and ITF Futures finals

Singles: 2 (1–1)

References

External links 
 
 
 
 
 

1969 births
Living people
Argentine male tennis players
Olympic tennis players of Argentina
Argentine people of Italian descent
People from Posadas, Misiones
Sportspeople from Rosario, Santa Fe
Tennis players at the 1992 Summer Olympics